Reward is the fifth studio album by Welsh musician Cate Le Bon, released on 24 May 2019 by Mexican Summer.

Composition
Reward dives into "revelatory" art pop and is a "lurid rush" of avant-pop music.

Critical reception

Reward was met with universal acclaim reviews from critics. At Metacritic, which assigns a weighted average rating out of 100 to reviews from mainstream publications, the album received an average score of 87, based on 18 reviews.

Track listing

Personnel
Credits are adapted from the Reward liner notes.

Musicians
 Cate Le Bon – vocals, guitars & synths , Mellotron , piano , percussion , bass 
 Stephen Black – bass , saxophone , clarinet  
 Stella Mozgawa – drums , percussion 
 H. Hawkline – percussive guitar , slide guitar , guitar 
 Samur Khouja – guitar 
 Josh Klinghoffer – guitar , synth 
 Josiah Steinbrick – percussion , synths 
 Kurt Vile – vocals 

Technical
 Cate Le Bon – production 
 Samur Khouja – production , engineering
 Josiah Steinbrick – production 
 Stephen Black – additional engineering 
 Noah Georgeson – mixing
 Heba Kadry – mastering

Artwork and design
 Phil Collins / Shady Lane Productions – art direction
 Ivana Kličković – photography & styling
 Andrea Bennett, Lisa Breitfeld, and Christian Fritzenwanker – hair & makeup 
 H. Hawkline – design and layout

Charts

References

External links
 

2019 albums
Cate Le Bon albums
Mexican Summer albums
Albums produced by Cate Le Bon